"John Wayne Is Big Leggy" is the debut single by British music group Haysi Fantayzee, released in 1982. It peaked at number 13 on the Austrian Singles Chart, number 3 on the German Singles Chart, number 4 on the Swiss Singles Chart, and number 11 on the UK Singles Chart.

Themes
The song was a combination of political satire and sexual humour, using nursery rhyme-style lyrics. The protagonist, John Wayne, is having sexual intercourse with a Native American female.  When Wayne's bandolier restricts their intimacy, she suggests he remove it. He refuses and suggests he sodomize her instead.

This surreal image is intended as a comment on the treatment of indigenous people during the European colonisation, and was written after Jeremy Healy read Bury My Heart at Wounded Knee by historian Dee Brown. Wayne represents the European colonist, while his partner is the Native American people.

Unusually for a song with explicit sexual content in the 1980s, the song escaped being banned from broadcast by the BBC, was playlisted on BBC Radio 1, and the band performed the song twice on Top of the Pops and on Saturday morning children's television. The song, with its "Shotgun, gimme gimme lowdown fun, boy! Okay, yeah, showdown!" intro, was taken to be a nonsensical novelty song about cowboys.

Critical reception

The single was well received in the British and European music press. Smash Hits described it as a Wild West shoot-out between Madness, Bow Wow Wow and Altered Images. Stewart Mason of AllMusic wrote, "it all sounds like an enormous put-on, but it's an entertaining one for anyone with a taste for early '80s ephemera." The song was listed in Smash Hits top 10 lyrics of the 80s.

Boy George, who had been a schoolfriend of Jeremy Healy and a fellow Blitz club regular, spoke of his jealousy of Haysi Fantayzee's success:

Track listing

Charts

Weekly charts

Year-end charts

References

External links
 

1982 debut singles
1981 songs
Haysi Fantayzee songs
Songs written by Jeremy Healy
Songs about actors
Cultural depictions of John Wayne
Songs written by Paul Caplin
Songs about Native Americans